Anisomeridium is a genus of lichens in the family Monoblastiaceae. The type species was originally named Arthopyrenia xylogena by Swiss botanist Johannes Müller Argoviensis in 1883; in 1928, Maurice Choisy defined the genus Anisomeridium, designating A. xylogena the type species.

Species
, Species Fungorum accepts 32 species of Anisomeridium:
Anisomeridium americanum 
Anisomeridium anisolobum 
Anisomeridium australiense 
Anisomeridium austroaustraliense  – Australia
Anisomeridium biforme 
Anisomeridium calcicola  – India
Anisomeridium carinthiacum 
Anisomeridium concameratum 
Anisomeridium consobrinum 
Anisomeridium disjunctum  – Australia
Anisomeridium excellens 
Anisomeridium foliicola  – Australia
Anisomeridium globosum 
Anisomeridium grumatum 
Anisomeridium guttuliferum 
Anisomeridium lateriticum 
Anisomeridium macaronesicum 
Anisomeridium macropycnidiatum 
Anisomeridium platypodum 
Anisomeridium polypori 
Anisomeridium prolongatum 
Anisomeridium ranunculosporum 
Anisomeridium robustum  – Europe
Anisomeridium subnectendum 
Anisomeridium subnexum 
Anisomeridium subprostans 
Anisomeridium terminatum 
Anisomeridium tetrasporum  – Hong Kong
Anisomeridium trichiale  – Panama
Anisomeridium triseptatum 
Anisomeridium viridescens 
Anisomeridium yoshimurae  – Japan

References

Dothideomycetes
Dothideomycetes genera
Lichen genera
Taxa described in 1883
Taxa named by Johannes Müller Argoviensis